
Year 186 BC was a year of the pre-Julian Roman calendar. At the time it was known as the Year of the Consulship of Albinus and Philippus (or, less frequently, year 568 Ab urbe condita). The denomination 186 BC for this year has been used since the early medieval period, when the Anno Domini calendar era became the prevalent method in Europe for naming years.

Events 
 By place 

 Roman Republic 
 The rapid spread of the Bacchanalia cult throughout the Roman Republic, which, it is claimed, indulges in all kinds of crimes and political conspiracies at its nocturnal meetings, leads to the Roman Senate issuing a decree, the Senatus consultum de Bacchanalibus, by which the Bacchanalia are prohibited throughout all Italy except in certain special cases which must be approved specifically by the Senate.

 Asia Minor 
 Eumenes II of Pergamum defeats Prusias I of Bithynia.

 China 
 The first burial at the famous archaeological site of Mawangdui is made during the Western Han Dynasty of China.

Births 
 Ptolemy VI Philometor, king of Egypt, who will reign from 180 BC (d. 145 BC)

Deaths 
 Li Cang, Marquis of Dai, buried in one of the Mawangdui

References